Gotabhaya, Gothabhaya or Gotabaya is a male given name with roots in the Sinhalese language of Sri Lanka.

Notable bearers of the name include:

Gotabaya Rajapaksa, current President of Sri Lanka.
Richard Gotabhaya Senanayake, a former Sri Lankan politician and son of Fredrick Richard Senanayake
Gothabhaya of Sri Lanka, a monarch of the ancient Anuradhapura Kingdom of Sri Lanka.
Gothabhaya of Ruhuna, a monarch of the ancient Kingdom of Ruhuna of Sri Lanka.
Theraputthabhya, one of the Ten Giant Warriors of Dutthagamani, whose childhood name was Gothabhaya.